Jesús Humberto Zazueta Aguilar (born 22 February 1956) is a Mexican politician from the Party of the Democratic Revolution. He has served as Deputy of the LV and  LX Legislatures of the Mexican Congress representing Guerrero.

References

1956 births
Living people
People from Sinaloa
Party of the Democratic Revolution politicians
21st-century Mexican politicians
Deputies of the LX Legislature of Mexico
Members of the Chamber of Deputies (Mexico) for Guerrero